Ben Pollinger is the former executive chef of Oceana restaurant in New York City, a Michelin star recipient.

Career
Pollinger was raised in New Jersey. He earned a degree in economics from Boston University and later graduated as class valedictorian from  Culinary Institute of America. He trained under chef Alain Ducasse at Le Louis XV in Monte Carlo.

After returning to New York, he spent more than seven years gaining culinary experience at Lespinasse, Les Celebrites, Tabla and Union Square Cafe.

After leaving Oceana in 2016, he opened The Hill restaurant in 2018.

Children
His son. Nate Pollinger

See also
List of Michelin starred restaurants

References

External links
Oceana

Living people
American chefs
American male chefs
Head chefs of Michelin starred restaurants
Culinary Institute of America alumni
Boston University College of Arts and Sciences alumni
Year of birth missing (living people)